Fredericksburg Impact is an American women’s soccer team, founded in 1995. The team is a member of the United Soccer Leagues W-League, the second tier of women’s soccer in the United States and Canada. The team plays in the Atlantic Division of the Eastern Conference against the Dayton Dutch Lions WFC,  D.C. United Women, Hampton Roads Piranhas, and Northern Virginia Majestics.

The team plays its home games at the Battleground Athletic Complex at the University of Mary Washington in the city of Fredericksburg, Virginia.

The team is a sister organization of the men's Fredericksburg Hotspur team, which plays in the USL Premier Development League.

Players

Current roster 2012

Notable former players

Year-by-year

Honors

Coaches
 Jen Woodie (2011–present)

Stadia
Battleground Athletic Complex at University of Mary Washington 2011–present

Average attendance
2011
2012
All-Time:

See also
Fredericksburg Hotspur

External links
 Fredericksburg Impact website
  Fredericksburg Impact on USL Soccer

   

Women's soccer clubs in the United States
Soccer clubs in Virginia
USL W-League (1995–2015) teams
Women's sports in Virginia